Jon-Erik Hexum (November 5, 1957 – October 18, 1984) was an American actor and model, known for his lead roles in the TV series Voyagers! and Cover Up, and his supporting role as Pat Trammell in the biopic The Bear. He died by an accidental self-inflicted blank cartridge gunshot to the head on the set of Cover Up.

Life and career
Hexum was born in Englewood, New Jersey, in 1957 to Thorleif Andreas Hexum, a Norwegian immigrant, and Gretha Olivia (Paulsen) Hexum, a Minnesota-born American of Norwegian parentage. He and his elder brother Gunnar were raised in Tenafly by their mother after their parents divorced when Hexum was four.

After graduating from Tenafly High School, Hexum went on to Case Western Reserve University in Cleveland to study biomedical engineering, and soon transferred to Michigan State University in East Lansing. During that time, he worked as a radio disc jockey, played football for the Spartans in 1978, and acted in minor stage roles. 

A few days after graduation, he moved to New York in 1980 to pursue his acting career. While working as an apartment cleaner, he met Bob LeMond of LeMond/Zetter Management, John Travolta's manager. LeMond saw great potential in Hexum. At LeMond's urging, Hexum relocated to Los Angeles in September 1981 to audition for a movie called Summer Lovers; he lost the part to Peter Gallagher. 

However, Hexum did win the lead role in the 1982-1983 NBC TV series Voyagers! as Phineas Bogg, a former pirate turned time traveler. Hexum was then cast opposite Joan Collins in the made-for-television movie Making of a Male Model, also starring Jeff Conaway and Roxie Roker.

Hexum was a guest star in a 1984 episode of ABC's primetime drama Hotel, playing Prince Erik, a Prince Charming–type character. Later in 1984, Hexum was cast opposite Jennifer O'Neill in the CBS primetime series Cover Up, playing Mac Harper, an undercover CIA operative posing as a male model. That same year Hexum played terminally ill quarterback Pat Trammell, a small role in the feature film The Bear, a tribute to University of Alabama football coach Paul "Bear" Bryant, played by Gary Busey. The Bear would be Hexum's sole feature film performance, released just three weeks before his death.

Death
On October 12, 1984, the cast and crew of Cover Up were filming the seventh episode of the series, "Golden Opportunity", on Stage 18 of the 20th Century Fox lot. One of the scenes filmed that day called for Hexum's character to load cartridges into a .44 Magnum handgun, so he was provided with a functional gun and blanks. When the scene did not play as the director wanted it to in the master shot, there was a delay in filming. Hexum became restless and impatient during the delay and began playing around to lighten the mood. He had unloaded all but one (blank) round, spun it, and—simulating Russian roulette—he put the revolver to his right temple and pulled the trigger, unaware of the danger.

The explosive effect of the muzzle blast caused enough blunt force trauma to fracture a quarter-sized piece of his skull and propel this into his brain, causing massive hemorrhaging.

Hexum was rushed to Beverly Hills Medical Center, where he underwent five hours of surgery to repair his wounds. On October 18, aged 26, six days after the accident, Hexum was declared brain-dead.

With his mother's permission, his body was flown to San Francisco on life support, where his heart was transplanted into a 36-year-old Las Vegas man at California Pacific Medical Center. Hexum's kidneys and corneas were also donated: One cornea went to a 66-year-old man, the other to a young girl. One of the kidney recipients was a critically ill five-year-old boy, and the other was a 43-year-old grandmother of three who had waited eight years for a kidney. Skin that was donated was used to treat a -year-old boy with third-degree burns.

Hexum's body was then flown back to Los Angeles. He was cremated at Grandview Crematory in Glendale, California, and a private funeral was held. His ashes were scattered in the Pacific Ocean, near Malibu, California, by his mother. He left an estate estimated to be worth $255,000. The death was ruled accidental. His mother later received an out-of-court settlement from 20th Century Fox Television and Glen A. Larson Productions, the production company behind Cover Up.

The episode on which Hexum had been working was broadcast on November 3, 1984, two weeks after his death. Cover Up continued production without Hexum's character. Three weeks later, in the episode "Writer's Block", aired on November 24, Antony Hamilton was introduced as agent Jack Striker, posing as a new member of the modeling team. Hexum's character Mac is noticeably absent, said to be on another mission. At the end of the episode, Henry Towler (Richard Anderson) breaks the news that Mac has been killed on the other assignment and would not be coming back. As the tears flow, the camera pulls back, and a memoriam written by Glen Larson appears on-screen:

Filmography

See also
 The Captive – 1915 film during which Charles Chandler was shot with a rifle.
 Rust shooting incident and Halyna Hutchins
 Brandon Lee
 List of film and television accidents

References

External links

Dark Tube - TV's Wicked History: Jon-Erik Hexum
Fansite

1957 births
1984 deaths
American male television actors
American male film actors
20th-century American male actors
Male actors from New Jersey
Male models from New Jersey
Michigan State Spartans football players
Tenafly High School alumni
People from Tenafly, New Jersey
American people of Norwegian descent
Accidental deaths in California
Deaths by firearm in California
Firearm accident victims in the United States
Organ transplant donors